Symona Ferner Boniface (March 5, 1894 – September 2, 1950) was an American film actress, most frequently seen in bit parts in comedy shorts, mostly at Columbia Pictures, particularly those of The Three Stooges. She appeared in 120 films between 1925 and 1950.

Early life
Boniface was born in New York City, the daughter of George C. Boniface, an actor, and his wife Norma ( Ferner) Boniface, an inventor.  Symona's father was of English extraction and her mother of German heritage, though both were New York natives.

Career

Boniface is probably best known as a society matron foil for slapstick comedy trio the Three Stooges, intercepting many a flying pie.  Thanks to the daily television broadcast of the wildly popular Stooge films, Boniface is widely seen on a regular basis. Boniface employed her comic timing in several of her appearances. She dealt with a shrinking or torn skirt in No Census, No Feeling and Crash Goes the Hash, squirmed uncontrollably thanks to a mouse crawling down her back in Loco Boy Makes Good, and was flooded in both Spook Louder and her final appearance, Vagabond Loafers. Conversely, she maintained her composure in Micro-Phonies and even dealt Curly Howard several painful face slaps in An Ache in Every Stake.

Half-Wits' Holiday
Boniface's tour de force performance came in Half-Wits Holiday opposite Moe Howard.  Mischievous Curly  grabs a cream pie from a pastry table, and tries to eat it whole. Moe sees this, swipes the pie, and pushes Larry out of the way. Seeing the approaching Mrs. Smythe-Smythe (Boniface), Moe tosses the pie straight up, resulting in it sticking to the ceiling. Noticing his nervousness and frequent upward glances, Smythe-Smythe sympathetically comments, "Young man, you act as if the Sword of Damocles is hanging over your head." Moe tells her she must be psychic and leaves. Bewildered, Mrs. Smythe-Smythe says "I wonder what's wrong with that young man?" and looks up to see what had him so concerned. At that moment, the pie comes crashing down in the society matron's face. The footage would be recycled four more times over the next 13 years in the films Pest Man Wins, Scheming Schemers, Pies and Guys and Stop! Look! and Laugh!.

Boniface also appeared in the Stooges' 1949 television pilot Jerks of All Trades, which would be the last project she ever appeared in. Stock footage of her would appear in six ensuing Stooges shorts following her death.

Personal life and death
Boniface married Frank Pharr Simms, a salesman and real-estate broker from Decatur, Georgia. Boniface was 56 years of age when she died of pancreatic cancer on September 2, 1950.

Selected filmography

 Baby Brother (1927, Short) - Party guest
 The Mysterious Lady (1928) - Party Guest (uncredited)
 Forgotten Faces (1928) - Roulette Player (uncredited)
 Show Girl (1928) - Show Girl (uncredited)
 Show People (1928) - Guest (uncredited)
 The Fatal Warning (1929) - Marie Jordan
 The Kiss (1929) - Gossip in Museum (uncredited)
 The Vagabond Lover (1929) - Musicale Guest (uncredited)
 Sunny Side Up (1929) - Woman in hallucination montage (uncredited)
 Daybreak (1931) - Bystander at Baccarat Table (uncredited)
 The Public Defender (1931) - Auction Attendee (uncredited)
 Dragnet Patrol (1931) - Ethel Bainbrick
 The Man Who Played God (1932) - Woman in Audience (uncredited)
 Arsène Lupin (1932) - Party Guest (uncredited)
 It's Tough to Be Famous (1932) - Autograph Seeker (uncredited)
 Back Street (1932) - Lady at Casino (uncredited)
 Pack Up Your Troubles (1932) - Wedding Guest (uncredited)
 Call Her Savage (1932) - Gambling Lady (uncredited)
 The Mind Reader (1933) - Gossip in Phone Montage (uncredited)
 Reunion in Vienna (1933) - Noblewoman (uncredited)
 Tarzan the Fearless (1933) - Sara (uncredited)
 Skyway (1933) - Baker's Girlfriend (uncredited)
 Beauty for Sale (1933) - Mrs. Fletcher (uncredited)
 Christopher Bean (1933) - Auction Participant (uncredited)
 The House on 56th Street (1933) - Blackjack Player (uncredited)
 Girl Without a Room (1933) - Woman (uncredited)
 Easy to Love (1934) - Roulette Table Player (uncredited)
 The Black Cat (1934) - Cultist (uncredited)
 The Murder in the Museum (1934) - Katura the Seeress
 The Count of Monte Cristo (1934) - Party Guest (uncredited)
 One Night of Love (1934) - Minor Role (uncredited)
 British Agent (1934) - Ball Guest at British Embassy (uncredited)
 Among the Missing (1934) - Prisoner (uncredited)
 Broadway Bill (1934) - (uncredited)
 Shanghai (1935) - Night Club Patron (uncredited)
 Pardon My Scotch (1935, Short) - Party Guest (uncredited)
 The Last Days of Pompeii (1935) - Slave Auction Observer (uncredited)
 The Golden Arrow (1936) - (uncredited)
 Marihuana (1936) - Helen - Burma's Customer (uncredited)
 Girls' Dormitory (1936) - Professor Clotilde Federa
 Slippery Silks (1936, Short) - Mrs. Morgan Morgan (uncredited)
 That Girl from Paris (1936) - Wedding Guest (uncredited)
 Confession (1937) - Actress (uncredited)
 Termites of 1938 (1938, Short) - Guest (uncredited)
 Tassels in the Air (1938, Short) - One of Mrs. Smirch's card-playing friends (uncredited)
 Women Are Like That (1938) - Lady Behind Claudius on Boat (uncredited)
 In Early Arizona (1938) - Doc's Saloon Sweetheart (uncredited)
 On Your Toes (1939) - Woman in Audience (uncredited)
 Ninotchka (1939) - Gossip (uncredited)
 A Plumbing We Will Go (1940, Short) - Party Guest (uncredited)
 No Census, No Feeling (1940, Short) - Bridge Party Hostess (uncredited)
 Souls in Pawn (1940) - Nurse at 'The Manger'
 All the World's a Stooge (1941, Short) - Party Guest (uncredited)
 An Ache in Every Stake (1941, Short) - Party Guest (uncredited)
 In the Sweet Pie and Pie (1941, Short) - Mrs. Gottrocks (uncredited)
 Some More of Samoa (1941, Short) - Mrs. Winthrop (uncredited)
 Loco Boy Makes Good (1942, Short) - Nightclub Patron with Mouse Down Dress (uncredited)
 Woman of the Year (1942) - Tess' Party Guest (uncredited)
 Born to Sing (1942) - Audience Member (uncredited)
 One Dangerous Night (1943) - Woman (uncredited)
 Murder in Times Square (1943) - Theatre Patron (uncredited)
 Spook Louder (1943, Short) - Well-Dressed Woman (uncredited)
 Clancy Street Boys (1943) - Dress Saleslady (uncredited)
 The Fallen Sparrow (1943) - Guest (uncredited)
 Crash Goes the Hash (1944, Short) - Mrs. Van Bustle (uncredited)
 Wilson (1944) - White House Reception Guest (uncredited)
 Mrs. Parkington (1944) - Clothing Fitter (uncredited)
 Lost in a Harem (1944) - Slave Girl (uncredited)
 Her Highness and the Bellboy (1945) - Maid (uncredited)
 Girls of the Big House (1945) - Matron (uncredited)
 Micro-Phonies (1945, Short) - Mrs. Bixby
 The Notorious Lone Wolf (1946) - Grand Dame at Airport (uncredited)
 Gilda (1946) - Gambler at Roulette Table (uncredited)
 Talk About a Lady (1946) - Ladies' League Woman (uncredited)
 Two Sisters from Boston (1946) - Opera Cast Member (uncredited)
 Earl Carroll Sketchbook (1946) - Screaming Woman (uncredited)
 The Mysterious Mr. Valentine (1946) - Landlady (uncredited)
 Gallant Journey (1946) - Dance Floor Extra (uncredited)
 G.I. Wanna Home (1946, Short) - Landlady (uncredited)
 The Jolson Story (1946) - Woman in Audience (uncredited)
 The Beast with Five Fingers (1946) - Mourner (uncredited)
 Half-Wits Holiday (1947, Short) - Mrs. Smythe-Smythe (uncredited)
 Angel and the Badman (1947) - Dance Hall Madam (uncredited)
 Born to Kill (1947) - Gambler at Roulette Table (uncredited)
 All Gummed Up (1947, Short) - Mother-in-law (uncredited)
 Heavenly Daze (1948, Short) - Mrs. DePuyster (uncredited)
 The Untamed Breed (1948) - Milly (uncredited)
 The Return of October (1948) - Hedwig (uncredited)
 Joan of Arc (1948) - Peasant (uncredited)
 The Man from Colorado (1949) - Matron (uncredited)
 Slightly French (1949) - Party Guest (uncredited)
 Vagabond Loafers (1949, Short) - Mrs. Norfleet
 Appointment with Danger (1950) - Woman (uncredited)
 Beware of Blondie (1950) - A Gossip (uncredited)
 Rogues of Sherwood Forest (1950) - Charcoal Burner's Wife (uncredited)
 Between Midnight and Dawn (1950) - Minor Role (uncredited)
 Pirates of the High Seas (1950, Serial) - Lotus Lady
 Pest Man Wins (1951, Short) - Mrs. Smythe-Smythe (archive footage) (uncredited)
 Bedlam in Paradise (1955, Short) - Mrs. De Puyster (archive footage) (uncredited)
 Scheming Schemers (1956, Short) - Mrs. Norfleet (uncredited) (final film role)
 Pies and Guys (1958, Short) - (archive footage)
 Stop! Look! and Laugh! (1960) - Mrs. Bixby / Party Guest (archive footage) (uncredited)

References

External links

1894 births
1950 deaths
American film actresses
Deaths from pancreatic cancer
Actresses from New York City
Deaths from cancer in California
Burials at Valhalla Memorial Park Cemetery
20th-century American actresses
American people of German descent
American people of English descent
20th-century American comedians